The SUB-2000 is a pistol-caliber carbine manufactured by Kel-Tec CNC Industries of Cocoa, Florida, United States. The rifle is a blowback operated, semi-automatic firearm with its operating spring located in the tubular stock.

The weapon feeds from a grip-located magazine well, using magazines designed for popular models of various other manufacturers' handguns, and is an inexpensive carbine.  The distinguishing characteristic of this rifle is that it folds in half, for storage and transportation, and its slim profile compared to other rifles.

Design
It is available in two versions chambered for 9 mm or .40 S&W caliber cartridges. It was designed by George Kellgren, a Swedish-American designer who also designed many earlier Husqvarna (in Sweden), Grendel, and Intratec brand firearms, including the famous TEC-9 handgun.

The receiver is made of an impact modified glass reinforced Zytel. The front end houses a hinge block holding the barrel and the rear sight. This block is securely locked in place by a swiveling trigger guard. The receiver rigidly attaches to the stock by multiple lugs. The bottom of the receiver forms the pistol grip, also accepting different magazines according to the version specified. The receiver also houses the firing mechanism. The 4130 ordnance steel barrel has a spring-loaded collar to ensure an accurate lock between the receiver and the polymer fore-end and the fully adjustable front sight. The fore-end also has integrated the ability to house batteries and/or other small devices. The tubular steel stock contains the bolt and is ended by the polymer buttstock. The heavy two-piece steel bolt holds the firing pin, the extractor and has the operating handle on the bottom. A captive guide recoil spring with buffer actuates the bolt. The firing mechanism is of conventional single action type. It has a positive disconnector, a push bolt safety that blocks the sear and disengages the trigger bar. The hardened steel ejector is internal. This design, with its long bolt travel, allows for very large functioning marginals.

The basic SUB-2000 design is implemented in a rather unusual folding design that folds for storage into half its total extended length. Folding is accomplished by pulling downward on the trigger guard and swinging the barrel assembly back over the top of the rifle. A latch in the buttstock secures to the front sight housing, and the gun can be locked with a key in the folded position for added safety. The gun cannot be fired when folded.

Variants
Models are available using a variety of semi-automatic pistol magazines in both 9mm Parabellum and .40 S&W.

References

External links
Kel-Tec's page for the SUB-2000 
Manufacturer: Kel-Tec

Carbines
Semi-automatic rifles of the United States
Survival guns